The Free Reformed Churches of Australia (FRCA) are a federation of 16 congregations, 14 in Western Australia, two in Tasmania and a home-congregation in Cairns.  At the start of 2016 the total membership was 4663. Their historical roots are in the Reformed Churches of the Netherlands (Liberated) as a result of post-World War II immigration, and their doctrinal roots are in the sixteenth-century Protestant Reformation and the Bible. The first congregation was in Armadale, Western Australia, founded in 1951.

Doctrine
As a confessional church, the churches subscribe to the Three Forms of Unity: Canons of Dort, Belgic Confession and the Heidelberg Catechism.
The churches submit to the following three creeds as summaries of the faith: The Apostles Creed, The Nicene Creed, and The Athanasian Creed.

Churches
The FRCA has the following churches in Western Australia, in order of institution:
Armadale - instituted 24 June 1951
Albany - instituted 14 December 1952
Kelmscott (daughter of Armadale) - instituted 1 January 1981
Byford (daughter of Armadale) - instituted 27 January 1985
Mount Nasura (formerly known as Bedfordale; daughter of Kelmscott) - instituted 1 December 1987
Rockingham (daughter of Byford) - instituted 6 September 1992
West Albany (daughter of Albany) - instituted 6 August 1994
Southern River (formerly known as West Kelmscott; daughter of Kelmscott) - instituted 29 November 1998  
Bunbury - instituted 25 November 2001
Darling Downs (daughter of Byford and Armadale) - instituted 6 July 2003
Baldivis (daughter of Rockingham) - instituted 1 July 2007
Mundijong (daughter of Byford) - instituted 6 December 2009
Busselton (daughter of Bunbury) - instituted 27 March 2011.
Melville (daughter of Southern River) - instituted 2 February 2014.
There is a home-congregation in Cairns, Queensland, overseen by Armadale.

and the following churches in Tasmania:
Launceston - instituted 15 February 1953
Legana (daughter of Launceston) - instituted 4 December 1988

Sister Relationships
The Free Reformed Churches of Australia have sister-church relationships with
Canadian and American Reformed Churches
Free Reformed Churches of South Africa (Die Vrye Gereformeerde Kerke in Suid-Afrika,)
Presbyterian Church in Korea (Koshin)
Reformed Churches in Indonesia (Gereja Gereja Reformasi di Indonesia, NTT)
Reformed Churches of New Zealand
First Evangelical Reformed Church of Singapore

Sister church relations with the Reformed Churches of the Netherlands (Liberated) (Gereformeerde Kerken vrijgemaakt) were suspended at FRCA Synod Baldivis in June 2015, and terminated at FRCA Synod Bunbury in June 2018.

Mission
Their local churches are actively engaged in mission work in several locations in Asia and the Pacific, including Papua New Guinea and Indonesia.  They have particularly close ties with the Canadian and American Reformed Churches, and many of their ministers have received their theological training at the Canadian Reformed Theological Seminary.

See also
List of Presbyterian and Reformed denominations in Australia

References

External links
Official web site for the Free Reformed Churches of Australia
Free Reformed Church of Southern River (Western Australia)

Reformed denominations in Oceania
Christian denominations in Australia
1951 establishments in Australia
Calvinist denominations established in the 20th century
Christian organizations established in 1951